Bordini is an Italian surname. Notable people with the surname include:

 Alessandro Bordini (born 1985), Italian blind man
 Carlo Bordini (1938–2020), Italian poet

See also
 Bordin

Italian-language surnames